Benedikt syndrome, also called Benedikt's syndrome or paramedian midbrain syndrome, is a rare type of posterior circulation stroke of the brain, with a range of neurological symptoms affecting the midbrain, cerebellum and other related structures.

Signs and symptoms
It is characterized by the presence of an  oculomotor nerve (CN III) palsy and cerebellar ataxia including tremor and involuntary choreoathetotic movements. Neuroanatomical structures affected include the oculomotor nucleus, red nucleus, corticospinal tracts and superior cerebellar peduncle decussation. It has a similar cause, morphology, signs and symptoms to Weber's syndrome; the main difference between the two being that Weber's is more associated with hemiplegia (i.e. paralysis), and Benedikt's with hemiataxia (i.e. disturbed coordination of movements). It is also similar to Claude's syndrome, but is distinguishable in that Benedikt's has more predominant tremor and choreoathetotic movements while Claude's is more marked by the ataxia.

Causes
Benedikt syndrome is caused by a lesion (infarction, hemorrhage, tumor, or tuberculosis) in the tegmentum of the midbrain and cerebellum. Specifically, the median zone is impaired. It can result from occlusion of the posterior cerebral artery or paramedian penetrating branches of the basilar artery.

Diagnosis
 Oculomotor nerve palsy: eyeball gazing downward and outward position, diplopia, miosis, mydriasis, and loss of accommodation reflex.
 Contralateral loss of proprioception and vibration sensations.
 Cerebellar ataxia: involuntary movements.

Treatment

Deep brain stimulation may provide relief from some symptoms of Benedikt syndrome, particularly the tremors associated with the disorder.

See also
 Claude's syndrome
 Wallenberg syndrome

References

External links 

Stroke
Rare syndromes
Syndromes affecting the nervous system